The 2007 BYU Cougars football team represented Brigham Young University (BYU) in the 2007 NCAA Division I FBS football season.  BYU clinched its second consecutive Mountain West Conference (MWC) championship title outright after defeating Utah on November 24. It was BYU's second consecutive, undefeated season in the MWC, its fourth MWC championship since the league began in 1999, and its 23rd conference title.  At the beginning of the season the Cougars had won an MWC record 16 straight league games dating back to 2005 and were on a ten-game overall winning streak, the longest winning streak in the country at the time.  The Cougars began the season with the second longest winning streak in the country at 11 wins until their loss to UCLA in the second regular season game.  The Cougars ended this season ranked 14th in the nation, highest of all schools from non-AQ conferences. This finish was the highest back-to-back rankings in the AP Poll since the Cougars won the national championship in 1984.

The Cougars improved their bowl record for the second year in a row.  They defeated UCLA 17-16 in 2007 and blew out the Oregon Ducks 38–8 in 2006 in the Las Vegas Bowl at Sam Boyd Stadium in Las Vegas, Nevada.

The Cougars played their home games at LaVell Edwards Stadium, named after its legendary coach, LaVell Edwards.

Pre-season

Spring Practice started March 19 and ended April 14 at the annual Blue/White Spring game.  The key question was who will fill the empty quarterback position left behind by John Beck: Max Hall, a redshirt sophomore, or Cade Cooper, a junior college transfer from Snow College.  On the third snap during the April 14 scrimmage, Cooper suffered a season-ending injury (Lisfranc fracture).  Hall was named the starting quarterback the following Monday, and Brendan Gaskins as the back-up.  Jacob Bower transferred out in late January.  Cooper then decided to transfer in July.

Among the 7 returning starters on offense and the 5 returning starters on defense are: Sete Aulai (center), Travis Bright and Ray Feinga (offensive guards), Dallas Reynolds (offensive tackle), Manase Tonga (fullback), Matt Allen and Michael Reed (wide receivers), Jan Jorgensen (defensive end), Bryan Kehl and David Nixon (linebackers), Ben Criddle (cornerback), and Quinn Gooch (free safety).  Dustin Gabriel had a foot injury during Fall camp to end his 2007 season, and make him unable to start as KAT.  Russell Tialavea, nose tackle, went out in Fall camp with a torn ACL and MCL.

Fall camp started August 4.  In the preseason, several players suffered foot and leg injuries (Gabriel, Tafuna, Cooper), like Lisfranc fractures, that may be related to the Nike shoes the players were wearing.

MountainWest Sports Network

Fans, coaches, players, and officials of the Mountain West Conference (MWC) eagerly hoped for progress on national distribution of the MountainWest Sports Network (the mtn.), particularly on satellite.  DirecTV continued to negotiate with Comcast for distribution in the MWC "footprint", but Dish Network discontinued negotiations until the FCC resolved a legal question regarding the Big Ten Network (BTN) that could potentially affect the mtn.  While satellite distribution seems closer, national distribution appears unlikely for the 2007 season.  Currently Dallas-Fort Worth is the only remaining MWC market that has no provider for the mtn.

During the season
The Cougars were ranked #25 in Sporting News pre-season ranking.  They started the season unranked in the Coaches Poll (with 47 votes) and unranked in the AP Poll (with 14 votes).

Injuries
Garret Reden suffered a season-ending injury.  Starting free safety, Quinn Gooch ended his season when he tore his ACL in the second half of the TCU game.

Postseason awards and citations
Freshman Harvey Unga was named to the Rivals Freshman All-America Second Team.  Unga, has 1,211 rushing yards and 629 receiving yards for the season, is the Cougars' all-time leading freshman running back and the first BYU freshman to pass the 1,000-yard mark in a single season. He has rushed for over 100 yards in seven games this season, the most for a freshman at BYU.  He is five yards short of the MWC all-time leading freshman running back.

Senior wide receiver Matt Allen was named one of 11 finalists for the Wuerffel Trophy.

All-Mountain West Conference Football Teams

Harvey Unga was named as the MWC Freshman of the Year, BYU's third recipient of that award following Luke Staley in 1999 and Austin Collie in 2004.

First Team Offense: Max Hall, Dennis Pitta, Ray Feinga, Dallas Reynolds, Harvey Unga* and Austin Collie*.
First Team Defense: Jan Jorgensen and Bryan Kehl.
Second Team Offense: Austin Collie and Harvey Unga.
Second Team Defense: Kelly Poppinga.
Honorable Mention: Austin Collie (KR) and Quinn Gooch

*CFN only

Schedule

Game summaries

Arizona

    
    
    
    

This was the 21st game between Arizona and BYU.  BYU was favored to win in this defensive contest.  BYU quarterback Max Hall took his first snap in Division I football after a 4-year hiatus of not playing a real game since high school, and the Wildcats began their first year using a version of BYU's spread offense.  BYU's experienced defense held the Wildcats scoreless until the last minute of the game.  Bronco took blame for calling a blitz that allowed an Arizona touchdown.  The offensive line was solid allowing Hall to show his competence with 66% completion, 288 passing yards and some decent scrambles. Unga impressed with 196 all-purpose yards. But special teams revealed room for improvement. Starting BYU fullback Manase Tonga was suspended only for this game due to an arrest related to a traffic stop.  BYU Backup inside linebacker Terrance Hooks was also suspended for this game.  At half time, BYU retired the number 14 at halftime in honor of Gifford Nielsen and Ty Detmer.  Hodgkiss will continue to use the number until the end of the season.  Redshirt Freshman, Harvey Unga was named the MWC Offensive Player of the Week with 67 yards rushing, 127 yards receiving, and two touchdowns.

Arizona Leads Series 11-9-1

UCLA

    
    
    
    
    
    
    
    

This was the 8th game between UCLA and BYU with UCLA favored to win by 8 points or so.  This game was widely considered to be the Cougars' toughest regular season game.  Emotions were high as Ben Olson, who originally committed to BYU, transferred to UCLA after his mission and was the starting quarterback for the Bruins.  The Bruins jumped out to a commanding lead at the end of the first half scoring their first touchdown on a 56-yard interception.  The Cougars drew within 3 points in the third quarter, and were poised to pull ahead reaching the "blue zone" with less than 6 minutes in the game.  However a forced fumble, as Hall intended to pass, stopped the Cougars final, successful drive.  Max Hall outplayed Olson; he impressed completing 30 of 52 passes for 391 yards compared to Olson's 126 yards.  Despite the score, the Cougars outplayed the Bruins, even in the first half;  the Cougars got 431 total yards to the Bruins' 236, but 11 penalties and 3 turnovers cost the Cougars the game.  This game ended the Cougars 11-game winning streak and their best chance at a run for a BCS bowl game this year.

UCLA Leads Series 7-1

Tulsa

    
    
    
    
    
    
    
    
    
    
    
    
    
    
    
    

This was the 7th game between Tulsa and BYU.  The Cougars defeated the Golden Hurricane 49-24 in Provo last season, but were handed a loss in this game.  Coach Mendenhall took responsibility for the loss; he stated that he did not prepare the team for the superior offensive prowess Tulsa possessed.  Tulsa's offense was led by its senior quarterback, Paul Smith, who drew BYU's secondary out of their zones and then threw over the top for large gains several times.  BYU's defense adjusted well in the second half, nevertheless, the team was also plagued with 14 penalties for 138 yards, 4 turnovers including a pick six for 49 yards early in the third quarter, and some poor kicking (including 2 missed PATs and a 29-yard field goal attempt).  Statistically BYU gained more yards than Tulsa in this shootout at 694 yards versus 595 yards of total offense.  Collie impressed with 8 kick returns for 237 yards, and Hall passed for 537 yards, but not enough for the offense to seize the win.

BYU Leads Series 6-1

Air Force

    
    
    
    
    
    

This was the 28th game between Air Force and BYU for BYU's Homecoming game.  Air Force hired new head coach Troy Calhoun this year after Fisher DeBerry retired.

BYU Leads Series 22-6

New Mexico

    
    
    
    
    
    
    
    
    

This win was the 57th game between New Mexico and BYU.  BYU beat the Lobos 42-17 on Senior Day last year.  This game featured the MWC's leading passer, UNM's Porterie, and was expected to test BYU's secondary particularly after the Cougar's shootout with Tulsa.  The game was tied at the end of the third quarter with a 71-yard touchdown reception by the Lobo's running back, Ferguson, and a 2-point conversion after BYU jumped out to lead with a pick six by Kehl in the first 2 minutes of the game and took advantage of five turnovers and a blocked PAT by Criddle.  Overall, the Cougars showed balance and performed well in all aspects of the game on both sides of the ball.  Bryan Kehl was named the MWC Defensive Player of the Week with 10 tackles including a sack, a forced fumble, a fumble recovery, and an interception for a 36-yard touchdown.

BYU Leads Series 42-14-1

UNLV

    
    
    
    
    
    
    

This was the 14th game between UNLV and BYU. BYU won the last meeting, 52-7, in 2006 and was favored to win this game by 10 points.  The game was at Sam Boyd Stadium, and will be Family Weekend for UNLV.  It was estimated that 15,000 BYU fans attended the game.

BYU Leads Series 11-3

Eastern Washington

    
    
    
    
    
    
    

This was the first matchup between Eastern Washington and BYU.  Corby Hodgkiss took a 39-yard touchdown interception on Eastern Washington's first drive.  Bryan Kehl and Quinn Gooch also came away with an interception each. Due to weather and an early defensive touchdown, BYU went away from the pass fairly early. The final quarter was one of the shortest in recent memory as the refs were very liberal with the clock. This was mostly due to the fact the score was 42-7 and there was a blizzard. The last 10 minutes in the game it was hard to see the field yet the cougar faithful cheered loudly until the end.

BYU Leads Series 1-0

Colorado State

    
    
    
    
    
    
    
    

This was the 65th game between Colorado State and BYU.  BYU beat the Rams 24-3 on the road in 2006.  BYU extended its conference record to 4-0 (including a conference win-streak of 12-0), its home-win-streak to 10-0, and became bowl eligible. The Rams reached the redzone 3 times in the first half, but only came away with one field goal. Hall completed 22 of 30 passes for 355 yards and three touchdowns, and his first game with no interceptions. Unga rushed 11 times for 51 yards making him BYU's all-time leading freshman running back with a season total of 735 yards. Unga also grabbed three receptions for 110 yards including a 53-yard catch and scramble.  Collie caught 8 balls for 111 yards including a 45-yard touchdown reception. Pitta added a 45-yard reception in the final quarter.  Gooch took his second interception of the season, and Jorgensen added 2.5 sacks to lead the team with 6.5 sacks.  Gaskins came in for Hall in the last minutes of the game to throw his first pass in a Division I FBS game which resulted in an interception and a 31-yard return for a CSU touchdown.

BYU Leads Series 35-27-3

TCU

    
    
    
    
    
    
    
    
    
    

This was the 9th game between TCU and BYU.  BYU went on the road to win 31-17 in this meeting last year, sparking their 8-0 run through the MWC.  Kelly Poppinga was named the MWC Defensive Player of the Week with a career-high 17 tackles including a tackle for a loss and an interception in this game.

BYU Leads Series 7-2

Wyoming

    
    
    
    
    
    
    

This was the 72nd game between Wyoming and BYU.  BYU dominated the Cowboys from the opening kickoff last season, 55-7.  This year BYU controlled the game from the beginning taking a 21-3 lead at half time.  Sophomore Max Hall was named MWC Offensive Player of the Week with 331 passing yards, over 70% completion and three touchdowns.  Hall broke the MWC's all-time sophomore passing leader by reaching 3,121 passing yards.  In BYU quarterback-factory history, Hall ranks third behind Ty Detmer and Robbie Bosco for passing yards in their first 10 games as a starter.  Hall went out in the third quarter after suffering a shoulder separation.

BYU Leads Series 39-30-3

Utah

Source: 
    
    
    
    
    
    

This rivalry game, unofficially dubbed "The Holy War," is typically the most anticipated conference game for each of these two teams.  In 2006, the rivalry was ranked in the Wall Street Journal as the 4th best college football rivalry game in the country.  (See also Utah–BYU rivalry.)  This was the 83rd game between Utah and BYU with the series going 49-30-4 for Utah since 1922.  Utah dominated the series 34-2-4 through 1964.  Since that time BYU has led the series 28-15.  Utah's 4-game-winning-streak against BYU ended last year with a game-winning, last-second play. In 2007, BYU achieved its first back-to-back wins over Utah since 2000–2001.

The game was largely a defensive struggle until the last few minutes of the fourth quarter. The Utes took the lead 10-9 when Darrell Mack scored the first touchdown of the game with just 1:34 left. On the ensuing possession, however, BYU converted on fourth and eighteen from their own 12 with a 49-yard pass from Max Hall to Austin Collie.  Harvey Unga made the game-winning touchdown run with 38 seconds remaining, and Austin Collie caught a pass in the back of the end zone for a two-point conversion, putting the Cougars up 17-10.  Unga became BYU's first freshman running back to gain 1,000 rushing yards in a season.  This was also Collie's 6th game for over 97 yards receiving.  BYU racked up 424 offensive yards to Utah's 244.  Unga was named the MWC Offensive Player of the Week, and freshman kicker, Mitch Payne, was named MWC Special Teams Player of the Week making 3 of 4 field goals.

Utah Leads Series 49-30-4

San Diego State

    
    
    
    
    
    
    
    
    
    
    
    

This game was originally scheduled to be played on October 27, but was rescheduled due to wildfires in southern California. This was the 32nd game between San Diego State and BYU.  The Aztecs fell 47-17 in Provo last October.  This game marked the Cougars' MWC record 16th straight conference victory.  Freshman running-back Harvey Unga scored a career-high four touchdowns with 161 rushing yards and 29 receiving yards.  Sophomore quarterback Max Hall completed 19 of 26 throws for 227 yards and three touchdowns. BYU was slow to put the game away, but had a 14-point lead by the end of the third quarter.  Harvey Unga and Jan Jorgensen were named MWC Offensive and Defensive Players of the Week.

BYU leads the series 24-7-1

Las Vegas Bowl

    
    
    
    
    
    
    

Eathyn Manumaleuna blocked a last second field goal by UCLA and BYU hung on to beat the Bruins 17-16. BYU quarterback Max Hall went 21-35 for 231 yards and two touchdowns. Manase Tonga led the rushing with 3 carries for 21 yards. The MVP of the game, Austin Collie had 6 catches for 107 yards and 1 touchdown. For UCLA, quarterback McLeod Bethel-Thompson went 11-27 for 154 yards and 1 touchdown and interception. The rushing game was led by Chris Markey who ran 27 times for 117 yards. This was the first time the Cougars gave up 100 yards rushing to a single player. Bethel-Thompson's favorite target was Brandon Breazell who caught 4 passes for 44 yards and 1 touchdown. The Bruins struck first with a 22-yard Kai Forbath field goal. A 29-yard field goal by BYU kicker Mitch Payne made it 3-3 after the 1st quarter. In the 2nd, Hall hooked up with Austin Collie for 14 yards and a touchdown to make it 10-3. Forbath then hit a 52-yard field goal to cut the lead to 10-6. With 1:03 left in the 1st half, Hall found Michael Reed for 13 yards and a touchdown. As time expired, Bethel-Thompson hit Breazell to make it 17-13 in favor of BYU at the end of the 2nd quarter. There was no scoring in the 3rd. In the 4th, Forbath made it 17-16 with a 50-yard field goal. BYU punted to UCLA with around 2 minutes left to set up a final drive for the Bruins. Bethel-Thompson, a fourth-string walk-on quarterback, along with Chris Markey drove to the BYU 49. On 3rd and 8 Bethel-Thompson hit Logan Paulsen to get to the BYU 13. That set up a chip-shot 28-yard field goal for Forbath, who already hit 2 50+ yarders. The kick was too low and Manumaleuna blocked it and sealed the game for the Cougars.

Rankings

Statistical leaders

Coaching staff

Players

Roster

Depth chart

References

BYU
BYU Cougars football seasons
Mountain West Conference football champion seasons
Las Vegas Bowl champion seasons
BYU Cougars football